Lutajuća Srca (Serbian Cyrillic: Лутајућа Срца, trans. Wandering Hearts) was a Serbian and Yugoslav rock band formed in Niš in 1970. They were one of the most notable representatives of the Yugoslav 1970s acoustic rock scene.

During the initial years a number of musicians passed through the band, with vocalist Spomenka Đokić, known for her trademark soprano, and guitarists Milan Marković and Miroljub Jovanović remaining the core members of the band, Lutajuća Srca eventually becoming a musical trio. During the 1970s the band won numerous awards on Yugoslav pop festivals. The band disbanded in the mid-1980s and had reunited for the recording of one studio album and several one-off performances  during the following decades.

History

1970 – mid-1980s 
The band's history begins in 1970, when Milan Marković, a student of the Niš Faculty of Arts, and Miorljub Jovanović, a student of the Niš Faculty of Occupational Safety, spent summer in Šušanj as scouts, performing popular songs on acoustic guitars by the campfire. When their company was invited to visit scouts in the nearby Bečići, they met Spomenka Đokić, also from Niš. Upon their return to Niš, the three formed Lutajuća Srca. The band's first lineup featured Spomenka Đokić (vocals), Milan Marković (guitar, piano, cello), Miroljub Jovanović (guitar, backing vocals), Vladimir Stojanović (guitar), Žarko Aćimović (bass guitar) and Ljubomir Ignjatović (drums). The members decided to name the group after the first two songs they composed, "Putnik" ("Traveller") and "Srce" ("Heart") – "Putujuća Srca" (Travelling Hearts). However, Aćimović's girlfriend-at-the-time suggested the name Lutajuća Srca (Wandering Hearts), which the members chose over Putujuća Srca. Initially, the band performed their own songs, as well as covers of songs by The Who, Free, Creedence Clearwater Revival and other foreign bands. Several months after the formation, Aćimović was replaced by Vladan Stanojević.

The band made their first recordings, of the songs "Putnik" and "Srce", on a reel-to-reel audio tape recorder and gave them to the members for the Niš League of Socialist Youth, who broadcast in on the walkway by the Nišava river, a popular gathering place for the Niš youth. The recordings were soon broadcast on Radio Niš, and, after a number of calls from the listeners, the station decided to offer the band time in the studio to make professional recordings. The band's songs, written by Jovanović and Marković, and Đokić's coloratura soprano brought them nationwide media attention.

On the 1972 Festival Omladina in Subotica the band won the First Prize, the Audience Choice First Prize and the Best Lyrics Award for their song "Još malo" ("A Little Bit More"). After this event, the band turned towards acoustic sound, in the new lineup, featuring, besides Spomenka Đokić, Milan Marković, Miroljub Jovanović and Vladan Stanojević, Vesna Koljević (piano) and Rista Trajković (flute). During the following years, Trajković was occasionally replaced by flutists Rade Ivanović and Dragan Miloradović. In the same year they won three awards at Festival Omladina, the band released their debut 7-inch single, with the songs "Još malo" and "Za tebe" ("For You"), for PGP-RTB record label, and started holding regular concerts every Saturday and Sunday in Niš Youth Centre.

In 1973, on the Vaš šlager sezone (Your Schlager of the Season) festival, they won the Union of Composers of Yugoslavia Award for their song "Jefimija", written by Dženan Salković and inspired by the life and work of medieval Serbian poetess Jefimija. They released the song on a 7-inch single, with the song "Pruži ruke" ("Give Me Your Hands") as the B-side. During the same year, they won the first place on the Zagreb Music Festival with the song "Brod za sreću" ("Boat Sailing to Happiness"). This song was released on a 7-inch single with the song "U sumrak" ("At Dusk") as the B-side during the same year. In 1973, the band also made numerous guest appearances on TV shows, held a concert in Zagreb club Kulušić with singer-songwriter Drago Mlinarec and the band Time, and represented Yugoslavia on the World Festival of Youth and Students held in East Berlin. During the following years the band often performed at pop music festivals, winning numerous awards.

In 1974, the band released their debut album, entitled Lutajuća Srca 1. The album was produced by Jure Robežnik. After the album was released, Đokić, Marković and Jovanović decided to continue activity as a trio. They went on several joint tours with singer Zdravko Čolić and singer-songwriter Kemal Monteno and performed as the opening band for the Scottish group Middle of the Road on their concert in Skopje. During 1974, the band members wrote music for Dragoslav Lazić's film Košava, also appearing in the film as a group of hippies, and for Stole Janković's TV series Partizani (Partisans). After the release of Košava and Partizani, the band got numerous invitations from theatres to write music for theatre plays.

In 1975, Đokić left the band and was replaced by Vesna Topolčević. With her as the vocalist Lutajuća Srca recorded the 7-inch single with the songs "Verujem u ljubav" ("I Believe in Love") and "Poruka kiše" ("Message of the Rain"). After the single release, the band made a hiatus because Marković and Jovanović went to serve their mandatory army stint. After their return from the army, they continued their activity with the new singer, Elvira Ignjatović.

At the end of the decade, Spomenka Đokić returned to the band. In 1981, the band released the album Strepnja (Worry) for PGP-RTB. The songs "U poznu jesen" ("In the Late Autumn"), written on the lyrics of Serbian 19th century poet Vojislav Ilić, and "Večernja pesma" ("An Evening Poem"), written on the lyrics of American 19th century poet Sidney Lanier, saw large radio play. During the same year, they released the album of scout songs entitled Šuma je izviđaču drug (The Forest Is a Scout's Friend). The album was recorded with the support of the Scout Association of Serbia and the Scout Association of Niš.

In the mid-1980s, the band ended their activity.

Post-breakup
After Lutajuća Srca disbanded, Spomenka Đokić started working as music teacher. Miroljub Jovanović became the manager of the Niš National Theatre. He was one of the founders of the Niš Musical Festivities festival and the art gallery of the Niš Cultural Center. For a number of years he was one of the organizers of the Niš Film Festival and the Choir Festivities festival, as well as of the Festival of Serbian Film in Vienna. Since 1993, he was the music editor on the Belle Amie radio, and later an editor and host on the Belle Amie TV. Milan Marković became a cellist in Niš Symphony Orchestra. He wrote music for over 30 theatre plays and formed several musical groups: ethnic music group Cantena Mundi, vocal ensemble Naissus and old city music band Groš.

1990s reunions
In 1994, Đokić, Marković and Jovanović reunited to perform in Radio Television of Serbia show Dobra stara vremena (Good Old Days), a studio concert featuring bands from the 1970s acoustic rock scene. In 1998, they reunited and recorded the album Sanjam te noćas (Tonight I'm Dreaming of You), which they self-released.

2010s reunions
In 2010s Đokić, Marković and Jovanović reunited on several occasions. In 2011, the band reunited to perform, alongside Leo Martin, Kemal Monteno, Ibrica Jusić, Zafir Hadžimanov, Vlada i Bajka, Rezonansa, Srđan Marjanović, Bisera Veletanlić, Tomaž Domicelj, Suncokret, Kornelije Kovač, Maja Odžaklievska, Atomsko Sklonište, Generacija 5, Goran Šepa, Sylvester Levay and other acts, on the Festival Omladina 40th anniversary edition. In 2015, the band reunited to perform, alongside Nikola Čuturilo, Dragoljub Đuričić, Zoran Predin and other acts, on a concert held on the Niš Fortress. In 2016, the band reunited to perform, alongside Daltoni, Tommy & Vanna and Vlada Jet Band, on a concert in Niš, as a part of Rok muzej (Rock Museum) project exhibition.

Post reunions
In 2016, documentary film about the band, entitled Lutajuća Srca – arhiv emocija (Lutajuća Srca – Archive of Emotions) was released. The film was directed by Vladan Ristić and featured, besides the band members, musicians Zdravko Čolić, Kornelije Kovač, Nenad Milosavljević, Srđan Marjanović, Biljana Krstić, actor Radoš Bajić, and others.

On 3 December 2020 Miroljub Jovanović died from COVID-19. Four months later, on 20 March 2021, Minja Marković died. Between their deaths, on 25 December 2020, the band was awarded the 11 January Award, awarded by the city of Niš to meritorious collectives and individuals.

Legacy
In 2006, the song "Jefimija" was ranked No. 94 on the B92 Top 100 Domestic Songs list.

In 2020, the band was awarded the 11 January Award, awarded by the city of Niš to meritorious collectives and individuals.

Discography

Studio albums
Lutajuća Srca 1 (1974)
Strepnja (1981)
Šuma je izviđaču drug (1981)
Sanjam te noćas (1998)

Singles
"Još malo" / "Za tebe" (1972)
"Putnik" / "San" (1973)
"Jefimija" / "Pruži ruke" (1973)
"Balada o barbi" / "Svetlosti jutra" (1973)
"Brod za sreću" / "U sumrak" (1973)
"Slutnja" / "Oni su se zavoleli" (1974)
"Poslednje jutro" / "Godine" (1974)
"Ti si tu" / "Luta srce moje" (1974)
"Naša ljubav" / "Peščani grad" (1974)
"Verujem u ljubav" / "Poruka kiše" (1975)
"Strepnja" / "Zaboravi me" (1979)

References

External links
Lutajuća Srca on Discogs
Lutajuća Srca – arhiv emocija documentary on YouTube

Serbian rock music groups
Serbian pop rock music groups
Yugoslav rock music groups
Musical groups from Niš
Musical groups established in 1970
Musical trios